The 2001–2002 Scottish Premier League (known as the 2001–2002 Bank of Scotland Premier League for sponsorship reasons) was the fourth season of the Scottish Premier League, the top level of football in Scotland. It began on 28 July 2001 and concluded on 12 May 2002.

Celtic were the defending champions, and successfully retained the title with a 5–1 victory over Livingston on 6 April 2002.

Changes from 2000–01 season

Winter break
This season was the first season since the Scottish Premier League (SPL) began in 1998–99 which did not have a winter break, meaning teams had to play throughout January. The break was abolished to avoid fixture congestion caused by more Scottish clubs participating in UEFA competitions and the upcoming FIFA World Cup. This change was criticised by many SPL managers, including Martin O'Neill and Alex McLeish.

European berths
Results in European competition over the previous five years saw the league move down from 15th to 16th in the UEFA country coefficient ranking. This meant that the league lost one of its berths in the UEFA Champions League qualifying rounds for the following season, and received an additional berth in the 2002–03 UEFA Cup qualifying round.

Teams
Twelve clubs participated in the league in the 2001–02 season – the top eleven clubs in the 2000–01 Scottish Premier League and the champions of the 2000–01 Scottish First Division.

St Mirren were relegated from the top flight after only one season of participation. They were replaced by Livingston, who secured the First Division title and promotion to the SPL with a 3–2 victory away to Inverness Caledonian Thistle on 28 April 2001. This would be Livingston's first season at the top level of Scottish football in their 58-year history.

Stadia and locations

Personnel and kits

Managerial changes

Overview
The 2001–02 season would be a record-breaking season for Celtic, who won consecutive titles for the first time since they won the title in both 1981 and 1982. Celtic accrued the most points in a season of any team in the SPL era (103), achieved the most wins in a season (33), conceded the fewest goals (18) and lost the fewest games (their sole defeat at Aberdeen in December ). They also went unbeaten at home for the entire league season – a run that would extend through the entirety of the following season, for 77 matches, until a defeat to Aberdeen on 21 April 2004. The only points Celtic dropped at home was in their final home game, an Old Firm derby against Rangers which was drawn 1–1. Celtic clinched the title at Celtic Park on 6 April 2002, with a 5–1 win against Livingston. Henrik Larsson again finished as the league's top scorer, with 29 goals.

Rangers started the season poorly and were 11 points behind Celtic when manager Dick Advocaat stepped aside and Hibernian manager Alex McLeish was appointed to replace him. However, Rangers still finished a distant 2nd, 18 points adrift of Celtic. They did, however, win the Scottish Cup and the League Cup, beating Celtic and Ayr United in the finals, respectively. They also reached the last 16 of the UEFA Cup, losing narrowly to eventual winners Feyenoord.

Alex McLeish's replacement at Hibernian was fan-favourite Franck Sauzée, who retired from playing to take the management role. However, he was sacked after only two months and 15 matches, having been eliminated from the League Cup in a shock loss to Ayr United, and the team second from bottom in the table. Hibernian did not win a league match with Sauzée in charge. Sauzée served as manager for the shortest time of any manager in Hibernian's history (69 days). Sauzée was replaced by Bobby Williamson, who led the team to safety in 10th place.

Newly promoted Livingston, under Jim Leishman, confounded pundits by finishing their first ever season in the top league in third-place, earning a spot in the 2002–03 UEFA Cup.

The 2001–02 season was the first in which the financial situation of SPL clubs was questioned. Total debt among all twelve SPL clubs was estimated during 2001–02 to be around £132m, having been barely into double figures two years previously. The end of television coverage from Sky Sports caused multiple clubs in the league to suffer severe financial difficulties.
In pre-season, Motherwell lost a number of players, including Andy Goram and Lee McCulloch, in an attempt to reduce the clubs wage bill. Manager Billy Davies also resigned early on in the season. Motherwell became the first SPL club to enter administration in April 2002, with debts of £11 million and a wage bill totalling 97% of the club's annual turnover. Davies' replacement, Eric Black, and chief executive Pat Nevin both left their roles with only two matches to go of the season once administration hit, and 19 of the club's players were made redundant at the end of the season.

Despite Motherwell's financial difficulties, it was St Johnstone who finished the season as the bottom team in the league, with only 21 points, 19 points behind 11th place. Their relegation to the First Division was confirmed on 6 April 2002, after a 1–1 draw against Motherwell left them 14 points adrift with 4 matches to play.

Format
In the initial phase of the season, each of the twelve teams play the other eleven teams three times. After 33 rounds, the league splits into two sections, a top six and a bottom six, with each team playing all the other teams in their section once. The league attempts to balance the fixture list so that teams in the same section have played each other twice at home and twice away, but sometimes this is impossible. A total of 228 matches will be played, with 38 matches played by each team.

League table

Results

Matches 1–22
During matches 1–22 each team played every other team twice (home and away).

Matches 23–33
During matches 23–33 each team played every other team once (either at home or away). This means that during matches 1-33 each team played every other team 3 times (either 1 home, 2 away or 2 home, 1 away).

Matches 34–38
During matches 34–38 each team played every other team in their half of the table once (either at home or away).

Top six

Bottom Six

Top scorers

Source: SPL official website

Attendances

The average attendances for SPL clubs during the 2001–02 season are shown below:

Source: SPL official website

Monthly awards

References

Scottish Premier League seasons
1
Scot